Velké Přílepy is a municipality and village in Prague-West District in the Central Bohemian Region of the Czech Republic. It has about 3,500 inhabitants.

Geography
It lies in a flat agricultural landscape of the Prague Plateau.

History
The first written mention of Velké Přílepy is from 1228.

Twin towns – sister cities

Velké Přílepy is twinned with:
 Zlaté Moravce, Slovakia

References

Villages in Prague-West District